The 1976 Espirito Santo Trophy took place 6–9 October at Vilamoura Golf Club in, Vilamoura, Algarve, Portugal. It was the seventh women's golf World Amateur Team Championship for the Espirito Santo Trophy. The tournament was a 72-hole stroke play team event with 25 teams, each with up to three players. The best two scores for each round counted towards the team total.

The United States team won the Trophy, defending their title from two years ago and winning their sixth consecutive title, beating team France by 17 strokes. France took the silver medal and Brazil, on the podium for the first time, took the bronze.

Teams 
25 teams contested the event. Each team had three players, except Sri Lanka, who only had two.

Results 

Sources:

Individual leaders 
There was no official recognition for the lowest individual scores.

References

External links 
World Amateur Team Championships on International Golf Federation website

Espirito Santo Trophy
Golf tournaments in Portugal
Espirito Santo Trophy
Espirito Santo Trophy
Espirito Santo Trophy